ABC Columbus can refer to:

WSYX, the ABC television affiliate in Columbus, Ohio.
WTVM, the ABC television affiliate in Columbus, Georgia.